The following highways are numbered 46:

International
 Asian Highway 46
 European route E46

Australia
 Greensborough Highway
 Carnarvon Highway

Canada
 Saskatchewan Highway 46

Czech Republic
 part of  D46 Motorway
 I/46 Highway; Czech: Silnice I/46

Germany
Bundesautobahn 46

India
  National Highway 46 (India)

Iran
 Road 46

Israel
 Highway 46 (Israel)

Japan
 Japan National Route 46

Korea, South
 National Route 46

New Zealand
 New Zealand State Highway 46

Ukraine
P46 road (Ukraine)

United Kingdom
 British A46 (Batheaston-Cleethorpes)

United States
 U.S. Route 46
 Alabama State Route 46
 Arkansas Highway 46
 California State Route 46
 County Route J46 (California)
 Colorado State Highway 46
 Florida State Road 46
Florida State Road 46 (pre-1945) (former)
 Georgia State Route 46
 Georgia State Route 46 (former)
 Idaho State Highway 46
 Illinois Route 46 (former)
 Indiana State Road 46
 Iowa Highway 46 (former)
 K-46 (Kansas highway)
 Kentucky Route 46
 Louisiana Highway 46
 Maine State Route 46
 Maryland Route 46 (former)
 M-46 (Michigan highway)
 Minnesota State Highway 46
 Mississippi Highway 46
 Missouri Route 46
 Nebraska Highway 46
 Nevada State Route 46 (former)
 New Jersey Route 46 (former)
 County Route 46 (Monmouth County, New Jersey)
 New York State Route 46
 County Route 46 (Cattaraugus County, New York)
 County Route 46 (Cayuga County, New York)
 County Route 46 (Chemung County, New York)
 County Route 46 (Columbia County, New York)
 County Route 46 (Dutchess County, New York)
 County Route 46 (Genesee County, New York)
 County Route 46 (Herkimer County, New York)
 County Route 46 (Jefferson County, New York)
 County Route 46 (Lewis County, New York)
 County Route 46 (Livingston County, New York)
 County Route 46 (Madison County, New York)
 County Route 46 (Oneida County, New York)
 County Route 46 (Onondaga County, New York)
 County Route 46 (Oswego County, New York)
 County Route 46 (Otsego County, New York)
 County Route 46 (Putnam County, New York)
 County Route 46 (Rockland County, New York)
 County Route 46 (Schoharie County, New York)
 County Route 46 (Steuben County, New York)
 County Route 46 (Suffolk County, New York)
 County Route 46 (Ulster County, New York)
 North Carolina Highway 46
 North Dakota Highway 46
 Ohio State Route 46
 Oklahoma State Highway 46
 Oregon Route 46
 Pennsylvania Route 46
 South Carolina Highway 46
 South Dakota Highway 46
 Tennessee State Route 46
 Texas State Highway 46
 Texas State Highway Loop 46
 Farm to Market Road 46
 Texas Park Road 46
 Utah State Route 46
 Virginia State Route 46
 West Virginia Route 46
 Wisconsin Highway 46

See also
A46
List of highways numbered 46A